Koshorisht is a village in the Elbasan County, eastern Albania. Following the local governmental reform of 2015, Koshorisht became a part of the municipality of Librazhd and is under the municipal unit of Lunik.

Demographic History
Koshorisht (Kosharisht) is attested in the Ottoman defter of 1467 as a village in the vilayet of Çermeniça. It had a total of six households represented by the following household heads: Pop Miho, Ivo Samuhrani, Jovan Belobradi, Qirkojan (possibly, Qirko Jani), Gjergj Çenkari, and Nikolla Berishi.

References

Villages in Elbasan County
Populated places in Librazhd